Red River is a 1948 American Western film, directed and produced by Howard Hawks and starring John Wayne and Montgomery Clift. It gives a fictional account of the first cattle drive from Texas to Kansas along the Chisholm Trail. The dramatic tension stems from a growing feud over the management of the drive between the Texas rancher who initiated it (Wayne) and his adopted adult son (Clift).

The film's supporting cast features Walter Brennan, Joanne Dru, Coleen Gray, Harry Carey, John Ireland, Hank Worden, Noah Beery Jr., Harry Carey Jr. and Paul Fix. Borden Chase and Charles Schnee wrote the screenplay based on Chase's original story (which was first serialized in The Saturday Evening Post in 1946 as "Blazing Guns on the Chisholm Trail").

Upon its release, Red River was both a commercial and a critical success and was nominated for two Academy Awards. In 1990, Red River was selected for preservation in the United States National Film Registry by the Library of Congress as being "culturally, historically, or aesthetically significant." Red River was selected by the American Film Institute as the fifth-greatest Western of all time in the AFI's 10 Top 10 list in 2008.

Plot

Thomas Dunson wants to start a cattle ranch in Texas. Shortly after he begins his journey to Texas with his trail hand Nadine Groot, Dunson learns that his love interest Fen was killed in an Indian attack. He had told Fen to stay behind with the California-bound wagon train, with the understanding that he would send for her later.

That night, Dunson and Groot fend off an attack by Indians. On the wrist of one, Dunson finds a bracelet he had been left by his late mother, which he had given to Fen as he left the train. The next day, an orphaned boy named Matthew Garth (played as a boy by Mickey Kuhn) wanders into Dunson and Groot's camp. He is the sole survivor of the wagon train, and Dunson adopts him.

Dunson, Groot, and Matt enter Texas by crossing the Red River. They settle in deep South Texas near the Rio Grande. Dunson names his new spread the Red River D, after his chosen cattle brand for his herd. He promises to add M (for Matt) to the brand, once Matt has earned it.

Fourteen years pass, and Dunson has a fully operational cattle ranch, but he is broke as a result of widespread poverty in the southern United States following the Civil War. He decides to drive his massive herd hundreds of miles north to the railhead at Sedalia, Missouri, where he believes they will fetch a good price. After Dunson hires men to help, including professional gunman Cherry Valance, the northward drive starts.

Along the way, they encounter many troubles. One of the men, Bunk Kenneally, raises a racket in one of the chuckwagons while sneaking sugar, triggering a stampede. This leads to the death of drover Dan Latimer. When Dunson attempts to whip Bunk as punishment for causing the stampede, the latter draws his gun. Matt shoots and wounds Bunk, probably saving his life because Dunson certainly would have shot to kill. Bunk is fired and sent home. Dunson tells Matt that he is weak because he did not kill his man.

Continuing with the drive, Valance relates that the railroad has reached Abilene, Kansas, which is much closer than Sedalia. When Dunson confirms that Valance had not actually seen the railroad, he ignores the rumor in favor of continuing to Missouri.

Dunson's tyrannical leadership style begins to affect the men, with his shooting three drovers who try to quit the drive. After Dunson announces he intends to lynch two men who stole supplies, tried to desert, and were captured by Valance, Matt rebels. With the support of the cowhands, he takes control of the herd in order to drive it along the Chisholm Trail to the hoped-for railhead in Abilene. With Matt now the trail boss, Valance and Buster become his ramrods. Dunson curses Matt and promises to kill him when they next meet. The drive turns toward Abilene, leaving Dunson behind.

On the way to Abilene, Matt and his men repel an Indian attack on a wagon train made up of gamblers and dance hall girls. One of the people they save is Tess Millay, who falls in love with Matt. They spend a night together, and he gives her Dunson's mother's bracelet. Eager to beat Dunson to Abilene, he leaves early in the morning, the same way Dunson had left his lady love with the wagon train 14 years before.

Later, Tess encounters Dunson, who has followed Matt's trail and now sees her wearing his mother's bracelet. Weary and emotional, he tells Tess what he wants most of all is a son. She offers to bear him one if he will abandon his pursuit of Matt. Dunson sees in her the anguish that Fen had expressed when he left her, and decides to resume the chase with Tess accompanying him.

When Matt reaches Abilene, he finds the town has been awaiting the arrival of such a herd to buy. He accepts an offer for the cattle, and meets Tess again. The next morning, Dunson arrives in Abilene with his posse. Dunson and Matt begin a fistfight which Tess interrupts, demanding that they realize the love that they share. Making peace, Dunson advises Matt to marry Tess and tells him that when they get back to the ranch, he will incorporate an M into the brand, telling Matt that he has earned it.

Cast

 John Wayne as Thomas Dunson
 Montgomery Clift as Matthew "Matt" Garth
 Walter Brennan as Nadine Groot
 Joanne Dru as Tess Millay
 Coleen Gray as Fen
 Harry Carey as Mr. Melville, representative of the Greenwood Trading Company
 John Ireland as Cherry Valance
 Noah Beery Jr. as Buster McGee (Dunson Wrangler)
 Harry Carey Jr. as Dan Latimer (Dunson Wrangler)
 Chief Yowlachie as Two Jaw Quo (Groot's second cook)
 Paul Fix as Teeler Yacey (Dunson Wrangler)
 Hank Worden as Sims Reeves (Dunson Wrangler)
 Ray Hyke as Walt Jergens (Dunson Wrangler)
 Wally Wales as Old Leather (Dunson Wrangler)
 Mickey Kuhn as Young Matt
 Robert M. Lopez as an Indian
Uncredited
 Shelley Winters as Dance Hall Girl in Wagon Train
 Dan White as Laredo (Dunson Wrangler)
 Tom Tyler as Quitter (Dunson Wrangler)
 Ray Spiker as Wagon Train Member
 Glenn Strange as Naylor (Dunson Wrangler)
 Chief Sky Eagle as Indian Chief
 Ivan Parry as Bunk Kenneally (Dunson Wrangler)
 Lee Phelps as Gambler
 William Self  as Sutter (Wounded Wrangler)
 Carl Sepulveda as Cowhand (Dunson Wrangler)
 Pierce Lyden as Colonel's Trail Boss
 Harry Cording as Gambler
 George Lloyd as Rider with Melville
 Frank Meredith as Train Engineer
 John Merton as Settler
 Jack Montgomery as Drover at Meeting
 Paul Fierro as Fernandez (Dunson Wrangler)
 Richard Farnsworth as Dunston Rider
 Lane Chandler as Colonel, the wagon master of the pre-Civil War wagon train
 Davison Clark as Mr. Meeker, one of Dunson's fellow ranchers
 Guy Wilkerson as Pete (Dunson Wrangler)

Production

Red River was filmed in 1946, copyrighted in 1947, but not released until September 30, 1948. Footage from Red River was later incorporated into the opening montage of Wayne's last film, The Shootist, to illustrate the backstory of Wayne's character. The film was nominated for Academy Awards for Best Film Editing (Christian Nyby) and Best Writing, Motion Picture Story (Borden Chase). John Ford, who worked with Wayne on many films such as Stagecoach, The Searchers and The Man Who Shot Liberty Valance, was so impressed with Wayne's performance that he is reported to have said, "I didn't know the big son of a bitch could act!"

The film was shot in black and white rather than color, because director Howard Hawks found Technicolor technology to be too "garish" for the realistic style desired. Second unit director Arthur Rosson was given credit in the opening title crawl as co-director. He shot parts of the cattle drive and some action sequences. The film's ending differed from that of the original story. In Chase's original Saturday Evening Post story, published in 1946 as "Blazing Guns on the Chisholm Trail", Valance shoots Dunson dead in Abilene and Matt takes his body back to Texas to be buried on the ranch.

Alternate versions 
During the production and while the film was still being shot, Hawks was not satisfied with the editing and asked Christian Nyby to take over cutting duties. Nyby worked for about a year on the project. After production, the pre-release version was 133 minutes and included book-style transitions. This version was briefly available for television in the 1970s, but was believed to be lost. It was rediscovered after a long search as a Cinémathèque Française 35 mm print, and released by the Criterion Collection.

Before the film could be released, Howard Hughes sued Hawks, claiming that the climactic scene between Dunson and Matt was too similar to the film The Outlaw (1943), which both Hawks and Hughes had worked on. Hughes prepared a new 127-minute cut, which replaced the book inserts with spoken narration by Walter Brennan. Nyby salvaged the film by editing in some reaction shots, which resulted in the original theatrical version. This version was lost, and the 133-minute pre-release version was seen on television broadcasts and home video releases. The original theatrical cut was reassembled by Janus Films (in co-operation with UA parent company MGM) for their Criterion Collection Blu-ray/DVD release on May 27, 2014.

Film historian Peter Bogdanovich interviewed Hawks in 1972, and was led to believe that the narrated theatrical version was the director's preferred cut. This view was upheld by Geoffrey O'Brien in his 2014 essay for the Criterion release. Contrarily, some, including film historian Gerald Mast, argue that Hawks preferred the 133-minute version. Mast points out that this is told from an objective third-person point of view, while the shorter cut has Brennan's character narrating scenes he could not have witnessed. Filmmaker/historian Michael Schlesinger, in his essay on the film for the Library of Congress' National Film Registry, argues that when Bogdanovich interviewed Hawks, the director "was 76 and in declining health", when he was prone to telling tall tales. Schlesinger also points out that Hughes's shortened version was prepared for overseas distribution because it is easier to replace narration than printed text.

Soundtrack

The song "Settle Down", by Dimitri Tiomkin (music) and Frederick Herbert (lyric), heard over the credits and at various places throughout the film score, was later adapted by Tiomkin, with a new lyric by Paul Francis Webster, as "My Rifle, My Pony, and Me" in the 1959 film Rio Bravo for an onscreen duet by Dean Martin and Ricky Nelson as John Wayne and Walter Brennan look on.

Reception
Bosley Crowther of The New York Times gave the film a mostly positive review, praising the main cast for "several fine performances" and Hawks' direction for "credible substance and detail." He only found a "big let-down" in the Indian wagon train attack scene, lamenting that the film had "run smack into 'Hollywood' in the form of a glamorized female, played by Joanne Dru." Variety called it "a spectacle of sweeping grandeur" with "a first rate script," adding, "John Wayne has his best assignment to date and he makes the most of it." John McCarten of The New Yorker found the film "full of fine Western shots," with the main cast's performances "all first-rate." Harrison's Reports called the film "an epic of such sweep and magnitude that it deserves to take its place as one of the finest pictures of its type ever to come out of Hollywood."

On review aggregator Rotten Tomatoes the film holds an approval rating of 100% rating, based on 29 reviews, with an average rating of 8.80/10.

Roger Ebert considered it one of the greatest Western films of all time.

This movie was the last movie shown in the 1971 motion picture The Last Picture Show.

In 1990, Red River was deemed "culturally, historically, or aesthetically significant" by the Library of Congress and was selected for preservation in the National Film Registry.

Red River was selected by the American Film Institute as the 5th greatest Western of all time in the AFI's 10 Top 10 list in 2008.

"Red River D" belt buckles
To commemorate their work on the film, director Howard Hawks had special Western belt buckles made up for certain members of the cast and crew of Red River. The solid silver belt buckles had a twisted silver wire rope edge, the Dunson brand in gold in the center, the words “Red River” in gold wire in the upper left and lower right corners, the initials of the recipients in the lower left corner, and the date "1946" in cut gold numerals in the upper right corner. Hawks gave full-sized (men's) buckles to John Wayne, his son David Hawks, Montgomery Clift, Walter Brennan,  assistant director Arthur Rosson, cinematographer Russell Harlan, and John Ireland. Joanna Dru and Hawks' daughter Barbara were given smaller (ladies') versions of the buckle. According to David Hawks, other men's and women's buckles were distributed, but he can only confirm the family members and members of the cast and production team listed above received Red River D buckles.

Wayne and Hawks exchanged buckles as a token of their mutual respect. Wayne wore the Red River D belt buckle with the initials "HWH" in nine other movies including North to Alaska, Circus World, Hatari! Rio Bravo, El Dorado, McLintock!, The Man Who Shot Liberty Valance and Rio Lobo.

In 1981, John Wayne's son Michael sent the buckle to a silversmith in order to have duplicates made for all of Wayne's children. While in the silversmith's care, it was stolen and has not been seen since. Red River D buckles, made by a number of sources, are among the most popular and sought after icons of John Wayne fans.

See also
 Cimarron1931 film mentioned on poster
 The Covered Wagon1923 film mentioned on poster

References

Further reading
 Eagan, Daniel (2010). "Red River essay" in America's Film Legacy: The Authoritative Guide to the Landmark Movies in the National Film Registry, London: A & C Black. , pp. 417–19.

External links

 
 
 
 
  on Lux Radio Theatre: March 7, 1949. 14 Mb download.

1948 Western (genre) films
1948 films
1940s English-language films
American Western (genre) epic films
American black-and-white films
Films about farmers
Films directed by Howard Hawks
Films scored by Dimitri Tiomkin
Films set in Texas
Films set in the 1850s
Films set in the 1860s
Films shot in California
Films shot in Louisiana
Films shot in Mexico
United States National Film Registry films
1940s American films